Karaçam can refer to:

 Karaçam, Çubuk, a village in Turkey
 Karaçam, Devrekani, a village in Turkey
 Karaçam, Savaştepe, a village in Turkey